Mohammad Nasser Afash (born 31 October 1966) is a Syrian former footballer who played as a midfielder.

Club career
Afash is one of the most notable Syrian football exports. Beginning his career with Al-Ittihad, he moved to Greece in 1993 to play for Proodeftiki before joining Ionikos in the 1996–97 season. He returned to Al-Ittihad in 2004.

International career 
Afash made seven appearances for the senior Syria national football team in qualifying matches for the 1994 and 1998 FIFA World Cup. He was a member of the Syria squad at the 1996 AFC Asian Cup finals.

He also played for Syria at the 1989 and 1991 FIFA World Youth Championship

International goals

References

External links

1966 births
Living people
People from Aleppo
Sportspeople from Aleppo
Association football midfielders
Syrian footballers
Syria international footballers
Syrian expatriate footballers
Expatriate footballers in Greece
Al-Ittihad Aleppo players
Proodeftiki F.C. players
Ionikos F.C. players
1996 AFC Asian Cup players
Syrian Premier League players
20th-century Syrian people